World2Fly is a passenger airline that operates out of Adolfo Suarez-Madrid Barajas Airport in Madrid, Spain.

History

The airline was established during 2021, after receiving the first of two leased Airbus A350-900. Based out of Palma de Mallorca the airline concentrates on flights to long haul destinations in the Caribbean and is owned by the Iberostar Group of hotels, a company whose previous holdings included another airline, Iberworld. Its destinations include Punta Cana, Cancun, and La Habana.

Destinations
World2Fly currently operates flights to several destinations mainly in the Caribbean.

Fleet

Current fleet
, the World2Fly fleet includes the following aircraft:

Historic fleet
World2Fly had the following airplanes:

See also
List of airlines of Spain

References

Airlines of Spain
Airlines established in 2021
2021 establishments in Spain